Fuleswari is a Bengali romance drama film directed by Tarun Majumdar based on a story of Bibhutibhushan Mukhopadhyay. The film was released on 3 May 1974 under the banner of Radharani Pictures. Hemanta Mukhopadhyay was music director of the film.

Plot
Fuleswari, a young woman, falls in love with Brindaban, who arrives in her village. She plans to marry him but is hesitant when she learns that Brindaban is involved in a crime.

Cast
 Sandhya Roy as Fuleswari 
 Samit Bhanja as Brindaban
 Utpal Dutt
 Rabi Ghosh
 Anup Kumar
 Tarun Kumar
 Lily Chakravarty
 Sulata Chowdhury
 Molina Devi
 Gita Dey
 Ashim Chakraborty

Music
The music director of this film was Hemanta Mukherjee. The lyrics of the songs were penned by Mukul Dutt, Pulak Bandyopadhyay, Arnab Mazumder and Tarun Majumdar. The film contains total twelve songs. These songs are:
 1. Ami Dekhte Bhalobasi - sung by Hemanta Mukherjee
 2. Jeyo Na, Darao Bandhu - sung by Hemanta Mukherjee
 3. Fuleswari Fuleswari - sung by Hemanta Mukherjee
 4. Shuno Shuno Mahasay - sung by Manna Dey and chorus
 5. Tapur Tupur Brishti Jhore - sung by Hemanta Mukherjee
 6. Ami Tomay Baro Bhalobasi - sung by Haridhan Mukherjee
 7. Ami Tomay Koto Khujilam - sung by Hemanta Mukherjee
 8. Hay Hay Hay Hay - sung by Sandhya Mukherjee, Aarti Mukherjee and chorus
 9. Tumi Shatadal Hoye - sung by Hemanta Mukherjee
 10. Shunun Shunun Babu Moshay - sung by Aarti Mukherjee
 11. Shuno Shuno Mahasay (Reprise) - sung by Manna Dey and chorus
 12. Hyade Go Padmarani - sung by Anup Ghoshal

References

External links
 

1974 films
Bengali-language Indian films
Films based on Indian novels
Indian romantic drama films
Films set in Kolkata
1974 romantic drama films
1970s Bengali-language films
Films directed by Tarun Majumdar
Films scored by Hemant Kumar